Karl Sabbagh is a British writer, journalist, television producer, and convicted sex offender. His work is mainly non-fiction: he has written books about historical events and produced documentaries for both British and American broadcasters.

Biography 
Karl Sabbagh was born in Evesham, Worcestershire, England in the March quarter of 1942. His father was the Palestinian Christian broadcaster , at the time working for the BBC Arabic Service; his mother, born Pamela Graydon, was English, of American and Irish parentage. His parents divorced soon after he was born and his father later lived in the United States, but Karl (originally named Khalil after his grandfather) remained in England with his mother.

He was the producer of the Royal Institution Christmas Lectures, ‘The natural history of a sunbeam’, by George Porter, in 1976 and ‘The planets’, by Carl Sagan, in 1977.

Sabbagh's book Palestine (2006) interweaves a history of Palestine from the 18th century with an account of his paternal family, who were prominent Christian members of Palestinian society in Galilee throughout that period, settled in the town of Safad from at least the beginning of the 19th century. The book includes a critical account of the Zionist settlement and eventual takeover of Palestine in the first half of the 20th century.

Personal life 
He is married to Sue Heber Percy and they have four children.

In September 2019 Sabbagh was jailed for 45 months and put on the sex-offenders register for life after being convicted of grooming a 14-year-old girl.

Bibliography
The Living Body (1984; with Christiaan Barnard). 	
Skyscraper: The Making of a Building  (1989) (the story of the building of One Worldwide Plaza)
Magic or Medicine?: An Investigation of Healing & Healers (1993; with Rob Buckman) (an investigation of alternative medicine)	
Twenty-First-Century Jet: The Making and Marketing of the Boeing 777 (1996)
A Rum Affair: A True Story Of Botanical Fraud (1999) (about the botanical fraud perpetrated by John William Heslop-Harrison)
Power into Art (2000) (the story of the redevelopment of Bankside power station as Tate Modern)
  Dr. Riemann's Zeros: The Search for the $1 Million Solution to the Greatest Problem in Mathematics (2002); The Riemann Hypothesis: The Greatest Unsolved Problem in Mathematics, 1st American edition (2003) (about the Riemann Hypothesis)	
Palestine: A Personal History (2006)
Your Case is Hopeless: Bracing Advice From the Boy's Own Paper (2007)
Remembering our Childhood: How Memory Betrays Us (2009)
The Hair of the Dog and Other Scientific Surprises (2009)
The Trials of Lady Jane Douglas (2014)
Antisemitism Wars: How the British Media Failed Their Public (2018)

See also
Palestinian Christians

References

External links
Bibliographical information from the British Library Catalogue and Library of Congress Catalog

1940s births
Living people
British non-fiction writers
People from Evesham
British male writers
English people of Palestinian descent
Male non-fiction writers
Writers from Worcestershire